Russell Muirhead is an American academic, politician, and author serving as a member of the New Hampshire House of Representatives for the Grafton 12 district. He assumed office on December 2, 2020. He is also the Robert Clements Professor of Democracy and Politics at Dartmouth College.

Early life and education 
A native of Hanover, New Hampshire, Muirhead graduated from Hanover High School and earned a Bachelor of Arts degree in government from Harvard College. The recipient of a Rhodes Scholarship in 1987, Muirhead earned a Bachelor of Arts in philosophy, politics and economics from Balliol College, Oxford. He later received a PhD in government Harvard University.

Career 
From 1996 to 1998, Muirhead was an assistant professor of political science at Williams College. From 1998 to 2006, he was an assistant and associate professor of government at Harvard University. From 2006 to 2009, he was an associate professor of government at the University of Texas at Austin. Since 2009, he has been the Robert Clements Professor of Democracy and Politics at Dartmouth College. Muirhead is a frequent seminar moderator for the Aspen Institute. Muirhead's research focuses on American politics, democracy, political parties in the United States, and the rise of conspiracy theories in United States politics. In 2020, he co-authored A Lot of People are Saying: The New Conspiracism and the Assault on Democracy with Nancy L. Rosenblum.

Muirhead was elected to the New Hampshire House of Representatives in November 2020 and assumed office in December. He is a member of the House Election Law Committee.

References 

Living people
People from Hanover, New Hampshire
Harvard College alumni
Harvard University alumni
Harvard University faculty
Alumni of Balliol College, Oxford
Alumni of the University of Oxford
Democratic Party members of the New Hampshire House of Representatives
Williams College faculty
University of Texas at Austin faculty
Dartmouth College faculty
Year of birth missing (living people)